Elachista lugdunensis is a moth of the family Elachistidae that can be found in Portugal, Spain, France, Germany, Austria and Sweden.

Adults are pale with indistinct ochreous or brownish irroration on the forewings.

References

lugdunensis
Moths described in 1859
Moths of Europe